The Battle of Rhodes or Invasion of Rhodes was fought in May 1912 as part of the Italo-Turkish War. Italian troops under Lieutenant General Giovanni Ameglio landed on the Turkish held island and took control after thirteen days of fighting, ending nearly 400 years of Ottoman rule. The battle became the major engagement during the Italian operations in the Aegean Sea.

Italian forces numbered about 9,000-10,400 men supported by a fleet of Regia Marina warships. Many of the Italian troops were veterans of the campaigns in Libya, having been shipped from Benghazi and Tobruk. The Regia Marina began operating off the island a few days prior to the invasion. On 1 May, the Italian navy cut the communications cable linking Rhodes with the mainland. An unopposed landing in Kalithea Bay began at 4:00 am on 4 May and lasted until 2:00 pm when the Italians began their march north towards the city of Rhodes. Ottoman Army personnel numbered about 1,000 men and officers with a handful of old artillery pieces though another 10,000 militiamen were recruited from the local Muslim civilian population. At first the Italians overestimated the Ottoman garrison on the island at 2,000-5,000, therefore they waited until they gathered enough men for the attack. Rhodes was protected by a castle but it was not utilized by the Turks and played no part in the battle. 

The first line of Turkish defenses was at Smith Plateau, where a few hundred men were stationed. Italian troops attacked the position, while eleven Italian ships bombarded the area. The Turks were routed with significant losses though the Italians reported that only seven of their men were wounded. Ottoman forces retreated that night to the mountains around Psithos and the Italians advanced to within two kilometers of Rhodes and stopped at 7:00 pm. When the city was surrendered the following morning at 10:00 am, the Italian army marched in without opposition.

Meanwhile, additional unopposed landings took place at Kalavarda and Malona Bay, both about thirty miles south of Rhodes. On May 7, the Wali of Rhodes was captured with over 100 Turkish officials by the Italian destroyer Ostro. The Turks were trying to flee the islands, but instead ended up going to Taranto on 11 May as prisoners. Lieutenant General Ameglio took the offensive again on 15 May against the enemy forces around Psithos. With the landings at Kalavarda and Malona Bay completed Ameglio and his main force were able to surround the Turkish position on three sides while the battleship Ammiraglio di Saint Bon bombarded troop concentrations from the fourth. After a nine-hour battle the Ottomans were defeated and the battle for Rhodes came to an end when the Turkish commanders surrendered the next day on 16 May. Eighty-three Turks were killed at Psithos, twenty-six were wounded and 983 surrendered. The remaining 10,000 militiamen returned to their homes. Four Italians were reported to have been killed in the final engagement and twenty-six men were wounded. After 390 years of Muslim rule, Rhodes was once again controlled by Christian forces.

Citations

References
 
 
 

History of Rhodes
May 1912 events
Amphibious operations involving Italy
Rhodes